Sagstuen is a Norwegian surname. Notable people with the surname include:

Einar Sagstuen (born 1951), Norwegian cross-country skier
Tonje Sagstuen (born 1971), Norwegian handball player

Norwegian-language surnames